Richard Sloan Folmer (February 13, 1942 – January 11, 2022) was an American actor who was based in Shreveport, Louisiana. He appeared in a variety of notable stage plays, television programs and films. Folmer also co-founded "The Company", a theater company located in Shreveport. Folmer latterly served as Artistic Director of the East Bank Theatre and Gallery at the Bossier Arts Council. His training included Hilberry Classic Theatre and personal coaching by acting coaches Cliff Osmond and Bob Everson. He died on January 11, 2022, at the age of 79.

Filmography
JFK (1991)
Doublecrossed (1991, TV)
Fatal Justice (1993)
Murder in the Heartland (1993, TV)
Dangerous Curves (1993, TV Series)
Fatal Deception: Mrs. Lee Harvey Oswald (1993, TV)
The St. Tammany Miracle (1994)
Walker, Texas Ranger (1995–1997, TV Series)
Heaven & Hell: North & South, Book III (1994, TV Miniseries)
Occhio Pinnochio (1994)
Last Fair Deal (1995)
The Stars Fell on Henrietta (1995)
Kingfish (1995, TV)
The Man Next Door (1997)
Just Sue Me (2000)
Seventy-8 (2004)
Mad, Bad and Dangerous to Know (2005)
Factory Girl (2006)
Mad Money (2008)
Straw Dogs (2011)
Searching for Sonny (2011)

Theatre
Death of a Salesman
Shadowlands
My Fair Lady
Sunshine Boys
Gene
Harvey
Zorba
Inherit the Wind
Fiddler on the Roof
Broadway Bound
The Nerd
Brighton Beach Memoirs

References

External links

1942 births
2022 deaths
Actors from Shreveport, Louisiana
American male film actors
American male stage actors
American male television actors
American theatre directors
Male actors from Louisiana